Seong Hon (1535 – 1598) was a Korean philosopher, poet, and politician during the Joseon Dynasty. He was a Neo-Confucianist scholar who was a close friend of the scholar Yi I (Yulgok) and an older contemporary of Yi Hwang (Toegye), leader of the country's "western faction" (seoin 서인, 西人) of the period.

Seong Hon is often referred to by his stylized name of Ugye ("bull valley") and Mugam ("black stone"). He gained eminence not only as a scholar but as a revered politician and reformer, attaining the position of Fourth State Councillor/Vice Prime Minister (Jwachanseong 左贊成) in the Joseon State Council (uijeongbu).

Selected works 
 "Ugye jip" (우계집, 牛溪集) (Works of Ugye) 
 "Jumun jigyeol" (주문지결, 朱門旨訣)
 "Wihak jibang" (위학지방, 爲學之方)

Father 
He was the great-grandfather of Yun Jeung through his daughter, Lady Seong, who married Yun Hwang and produced a son, Yun Seon-geo, father of Yun Jeung.

See also 
 Korean Confucianism
 Neo Confucianism
 Yi I
 Yi Hwang
 Jeong gu
 Cho sik

References

External links 
 Seong Hon:naver 
 Seong Hon 
 seong hon 
 Korean philosophy: Information from Answers 
 The Study on Moral Philosophy the Theory of Body and Mind Training of Gubong Song Ik-pil 
 Ugye Sung Hon`s viewpoint on the "Four-Seven" theory and the Eclectic School of the later Chosun 

1535 births
1598 deaths
16th-century Korean philosophers
16th-century Korean poets
Joseon scholar-officials
Korean Confucianists